I Created Disco is the debut studio album by Scottish musician Calvin Harris, released on 15 June 2007 by Columbia Records. It was preceded by the singles "Acceptable in the 80s" and "The Girls", which reached numbers 10 and three on the UK Singles Chart, respectively. The album debuted at number eight on the UK Albums Chart with first-week sales of 16,121 copies. On 23 May 2008, it was certified gold by the British Phonographic Industry (BPI). I Created Disco had sold 223,845 copies in the United Kingdom by November 2014.

Writing and recording
Writing and recording for I Created Disco started in 2006 when Harris moved back to his hometown of Dumfries, Scotland, after living in London for two years. All recording and producing for the album took place on an Amiga computer with OctaMED,  a music tracker, in Harris' home studio, called Calvinharrisbeats Studio. All 14 tracks on the album were written, produced and performed solely by Harris.

Promotion
Preceding the release of the album, Columbia released two singles, "Acceptable in the 80s" and "The Girls". Harris and his band supported both Faithless and Groove Armada on their live arena tours in the second quarter of 2007. The album cover was also used to promote the fourth generation iPod Nano in yellow.

Critical reception

I Created Disco received mixed reviews from music critics. At Metacritic, which assigns a normalised rating out of 100 to reviews from mainstream publications, the album received an average score of 59, based on 17 reviews.

Track listing

Personnel
Credits adapted from the liner notes of I Created Disco.

 Calvin Harris – vocals, arrangement, instruments, production
 Guy Davie – mastering
 Joanne Morris – design

Charts

Weekly charts

Year-end charts

Certifications

|}

Release history

References

2007 debut albums
Albums produced by Calvin Harris
Albums recorded in a home studio
Calvin Harris albums
Columbia Records albums